Communion is the third album by American jazz trumpeter Roy Campbell and the debut recording with his Pyramid Trio with bassist William Parker and Reggie Nicholson replacing original drummer Zen Matsuura. The album was recorded in 1994 and released on the Swedish Silkheart label. Roy pays tribute to avant-garde jazz musicians Don Cherry, Hannibal Marvin Peterson, and brothers Don & Albert Ayler.

Reception

Scott Yanow, in his review for AllMusic, says because of the length of some of the pieces, "there are some meandering moments but in general the interplay between the three musicians holds one's interest."
The Penguin Guide to Jazz states "Campbell remains a gratifying and lyrical performer, even at his furthest out."

Track listing
All compositions by Roy Campbell except as indicated
 "Communion" (William Parker) - 9:15 
 "Vigilance" - 9:18 
 "Chant for Don Cherry"- 12:04 
 "Air Pockets" (William Parker) - 14:32 
 "Blues for Albert and Don Ayler" - 15:22 
 "One for Hannibal" - 14:09

Personnel
Roy Campbell - trumpet, flugelhorn, pocket trumpet, cornet, percussion
William Parker - bass, percussion
Reggie Nicholson - drums, percussion

References

Silkheart Records albums
Roy Campbell Jr. albums
1995 albums